Iļja Novikovs (born 12 August 1977) is a retired Latvian football midfielder.

References

1977 births
Living people
Latvian footballers
Skonto FC players
Association football midfielders
Latvia international footballers